Stefan Ingvarsson (14 December 1946 – 4 March 2017) was a Swedish racewalker. He competed at the 1968 Summer Olympics and the 1972 Summer Olympics.

References

External links
 

1946 births
2017 deaths
Athletes (track and field) at the 1968 Summer Olympics
Athletes (track and field) at the 1972 Summer Olympics
Swedish male racewalkers
Olympic athletes of Sweden
Place of birth missing
People from Värnamo Municipality
Sportspeople from Jönköping County
20th-century Swedish people
21st-century Swedish people